Legislative elections were held in El Salvador on 4 March 2018 to choose 84 members of the Legislative Assembly and 262 mayors. The elections were carried out by the Supreme Electoral Tribunal.

Electoral system
The 84 members of the Legislative Assembly are elected by open list proportional representation from 14 multi-member constituencies based on the departments, with seats allocated using the largest remainder method.

Legislative election

By department

Municipal

Departmental capitals

References

Legislative elections in El Salvador
2018 in El Salvador
2018 elections in Central America
2018